The Northeast administrative region of the Missouri Department of Conservation encompasses Adair, Clark, Knox, Lewis, Macon, Marion, Monroe, Pike, Putnam, Ralls, Randolph, Schuyler, Scotland, Shelby, and Sullivan counties.  The regional conservation office is in Kirksville.

Notes 

 Acreage and counties from MDCLand GIS file
 Names, descriptions, and locations from Conservation Atlas Online GIS file

References 

 
 

Northeast region